The Green Cloak is a surviving 1915 American silent mystery film directed by Walter Edwin and starring Broadway stage actress Irene Fenwick.

An extant film, a print is held by George Eastman House.

Cast
Irene Fenwick as Ruth McAllister
Blanche Aimee as Kate McAllister
Della Connor as Ella Lenox
Kathryn Brook as Mrs. Lenox
Anna Reader as Jane
Roland Bottomley as John Gilbert
John Davidson as Paul Duncan
Frank Belcher as Sgt. Sims
Richie Ling as Wilkins
William Anker as The Professor

References

External links

1915 films
American silent feature films
American mystery films
American black-and-white films
1915 mystery films
1910s American films
Silent mystery films